Bangladesh Overseas Employment and Services Limited is a government owned manpower export company located in Dhaka, Bangladesh.

History
The organisation was established in 1984. The company exports manpower from Bangladesh to a number of countries.

References

Government-owned companies of Bangladesh
1984 establishments in Bangladesh
Companies based in Dhaka
Employment agencies of Bangladesh